Eduard-Michael Grosu (born 4 September 1992) is a Romanian professional racing cyclist, who currently rides for UCI Continental team . He is the first Romanian to ride professionally.

Major results

2008
 2nd Time trial, National Junior Road Championships
 Balkan Cadet Road Championships
3rd Road race
3rd Time trial
2009
 2nd Time trial, National Junior Road Championships
2010
 1st  Time trial, National Junior Road Championships
2011
 1st  National Cyclo-cross Championships
 3rd Road race, National Under-23 Road Championships
2012
 3rd Overall Tour of Trakya
 9th Grand Prix Dobrich II
2013
 1st  Time trial, National Road Championships
 1st  Time trial, National Under-23 Road Championships
 1st Stage 3 Tour of Romania
2014
 National Under-23 Road Championships
1st  Road race
2nd Time trial
 1st  Overall Tour of Estonia
1st Points classification
1st Young rider classification
1st Stage 1
 1st Stage 12 Tour of Qinghai Lake
 2nd Overall Carpathian Couriers Race
1st  Points classification
1st Stages 5 & 6
 2nd Ronde van Midden-Nederland
 3rd Road race, National Road Championships
 7th GP Izola
 10th Overall Szlakiem Grodów Piastowskich
2015
 4th Gran Piemonte
 6th Grand Prix de Fourmies
 8th Brussels Cycling Classic
 9th Coppa Bernocchi
2016
 1st  National Cyclo-cross Championships
 2nd Time trial, National Road Championships
 9th Overall Tour of Taihu Lake
1st Stage 5
 9th Nokere Koerse
2017
 1st  Time trial, National Road Championships
 1st  National Cyclo-cross Championships
 Sibiu Cycling Tour
1st  Romanian rider classification
1st Stage 4
 9th Gran Premio della Costa Etruschi
2018
 National Road Championships
1st  Road race
1st  Time trial
 1st  National Cyclo-cross Championships
 Tour of Qinghai Lake
1st Stages 3, 7 & 8
 Tour of Croatia
1st  Points classification
1st Stage 2
 10th Three Days of Bruges–De Panne
2019
 1st Ronde van Limburg
 Tour of Qinghai Lake
1st  Points classification
1st Stages 3 & 6
 1st Stage 2 Okolo Slovenska
 1st Stage 2 CRO Race
 3rd Time trial, National Road Championships
 5th Route Adélie
2020
 1st  Overall Tour of Romania
1st Stages 3 & 4
 National Road Championships
3rd Road race
3rd Time trial
 5th Paris–Camembert
 8th Overall Tour of Szeklerland
2021
 2nd Road race, National Road Championships
 5th Bredene Koksijde Classic

Grand Tour general classification results timeline

References

External links

1992 births
Living people
Romanian male cyclists
People from Zărnești
European Games competitors for Romania
Cyclists at the 2015 European Games
Cyclists at the 2019 European Games
Olympic cyclists of Romania
Cyclists at the 2020 Summer Olympics
20th-century Romanian people
21st-century Romanian people